Throwing Knives is a collection of short stories by Molly Best Tinsley, first published on 1 February 2000. It was awarded the 2001 Oregon Book Award for fiction, as well as the 1999 Sandstone Prize in Short Fiction offered by the Ohio State University Press.

External links
Publisher description

2000 short story collections
American short story collections
Ohio State University